Elgibbor, also known as Jarek Pozarycki (age 41) or Fire, is an unblack metal project, that started in 1999. The band went on a hiatus around 2017, but reconvened with a full-lineup in 2020, consisting mostly of former live members.

Background
Elgibbor started in between 1996 and 1998, but did not truly do anything until 1999 as an unblack metal. The project has released 12 studio albums and several demos, EPs and singles. The name of the project means, "God Almighty". Jarek, before becoming a Christian, was a Satanist.  Since becoming a Christian, his faith has been the foundation of his band. Although Elgibbor is a one-man band, founded by Fire, the band played out live at Audiofeed Festival 2017, with the lineup of Fire on guitar, former Frost Like Ashes bandmates Azahel on vocals and Sebat on guitar, Ascending King brainchild Ruah on bass, and bandmate Taberah of Katharos on drums. In 2020, the band reconvened with many of the live members returning - Azahel on vocals, Fire on guitars, Sebat on guitars, and Ruah on bass. Taberah was unable to return to the lineup due to personal reasons, which led to the induction of Pathøs (Symphony of Heaven) into the band. The band released Corruptus Vindicta, in the spring of 2021 through Vision of God records.

Influences
Fire stated in an interview that his influences "always come from Jesus" and he does not listen to secular metal. When he says it "always comes from Jesus", he is implying that he only listens to Christian metal artists, including Crimson Moonlight, Arvinger, Drottnar, and Antestor.

Members
Current

Elgibbor is primarily a solo project, but have had two other members.

Former
 Thunder Morr – drums (2012–2014)
 Kalle "Armath Sargon" Kannisto – effects, keyboards, choirs (2012–2015)

Live Members

Discography
Studio albums
 Apolutrosis (2004)
 Halal (2005)
 Satan Is Defeated (2007)
 Stronger Than Hell (2007)
 Fireland (2008)
 Repent or Perish (2008)
 War (2009)
 Soterion Apollumi Hamartia (2010)
 The Imminent Invasion (2011)
 The Dungeons of Hell (2012)
 The Path of Suffering (2014)
 Revenger of Blood (2016)
 Resist Him (2017)
 Corruptus Vindicta (2021)

EPs
 Halal – Where Death Is Your Victory (2006; split with Moriah)
 The  Inextinguishable Blaze (2006)
 Slava Bogu (2011; split w/ Pilgrimage)

Demos
 Elgibbor (2000)
 Berit (2002)
 Satan Is Defeated (2003)
 Confessions (2004)
 Like a Lamb to the Slaughter (2005)

Singles
 "Armageddon" (2015)
 "The Lamp" (2015)
 "The Beast Out of the Earth" (2015)
 "The Separation" (2015)
 "Deliverer" (2015)
 "Righteousness" (2015)
 "My Light Upon Your Path" (2016)
 "Fire and Sword" (2016)
 "The Sound of Your Voice" (2016)
 "Vision of Darkness" (2016)
 "The Anchor" (2016)
 "Repent One Day Before You Die!" (2016)
 "From Hell to the Sky" (2016)

References

External links
 Elgibbor tags on Metal Underground
 Elgibbor tags on The Metal Resource

Musical groups established in 1999
Christian metal musical groups
Vision of God Records artists
Unblack metal musical groups
1999 establishments in Poland